West Lochaber is a small community in the Canadian province of Nova Scotia, located  in Antigonish County.

References
West Lochaber on Destination Nova Scotia

Official Website of The Community of Lochaber

Communities in Antigonish County, Nova Scotia
General Service Areas in Nova Scotia